Granville Richard Seymour Redmond (March 9, 1871 – May 24, 1935) was an American landscape painter and exponent of Tonalism and California Impressionism. He was also an occasional actor for his friend Charlie Chaplin.

Early years 

Redmond was born in Philadelphia, Pennsylvania, on March 9, 1871, to a hearing family. He contracted scarlet fever at around 2½ to the age of 3; when he recovered, he was found to be deaf. This may have prompted his family's decision to move from the East Coast to San Jose, California: the possibility for his education at the Berkeley School for the Deaf.

Study 

Granville attended the California School for the Deaf in Berkeley from 1879 to 1890 where his artistic talents were recognized and encouraged. There his teacher Theophilus d'Estrella taught him painting, drawing and pantomime.

When he graduated from CSD, Redmond enrolled at another CSD: the California School of Design in San Francisco, where he worked for three years with teachers such as Arthur Frank Mathews and Amédée Joullin. He famously won the W. E. Brown Medal of Excellence. He associated with many other artists, including Gottardo Piazzoni and Giuseppe Cadenasso. Piazzoni learned American Sign Language, and he and Redmond became lifelong friends. They lived together in Parkfield and Tiburon, California.

In 1893 Redmond won a scholarship from the California School of the Deaf which made it possible for him to study in Paris at the Académie Julian under teachers Jean-Paul Laurens and Jean-Joseph Benjamin-Constant.  He roomed with the sculptor Douglas Tilden, another graduate of the California School for the Deaf. "Tilden was a tremendous help to Redmond, teaching him French and how to get around in Paris; they became best friends for the rest of their lives." In 1895, Redmond's painting Matin d'Hiver was accepted for the Paris Salon.

Back in California 

In 1898, he returned to California and settled in Los Angeles. He was married in 1899 to Carrie Ann Jean, a former student of the Illinois School for the Deaf. Together they had three children.

Working with Chaplin 

While living in Los Angeles, he became friends with Charles Chaplin, who admired the natural expressiveness of a deaf person using American Sign Language. Chaplin asked Redmond to help him develop the techniques Chaplin later used in his silent films. Chaplin, impressed with Redmond's skill, gave Redmond a studio on the movie lot, collected his paintings, and sponsored him in silent acting roles, including the sculptor in City Lights. Chaplin told a writer for The Silent Worker of a Redmond painting, "I could look at it for hours. It means so many things"  and Chaplin's famous The Dance of the Oceana Rolls was Redmond-inspired.
 
During this time Redmond did not neglect his painting. Through Chaplin he met Los Angeles neighbor artists Elmer Wachtel and Norman St. Clair. They showed works at the Spring Exhibition held in San Francisco in 1904. By 1905 Redmond was receiving considerable recognition as a leading landscape painter and bold colorist.

He died on May 24, 1935, in Los Angeles.

Selected paintings

Filmography

Collections 
 Bancroft Library, University of California, Berkeley.
 California School for the Deaf, Fremont.
 Cantor Arts Center, Stanford.
 Crocker Art Museum, Sacramento.
 De Young Museum, San Francisco.
 Granville Redmond Fine Art, Los Angeles.
 Huntington Library, San Marino, California.
 Los Angeles County Museum of Art.
 K. Nathan Gallery, La Jolla, California.
 Museum of the City of New York.
 Oakland Museum of California

Awards 
 Gold Medal, W. E. Brown Award, California School of Design, 1892.
 Medal, Louisiana Purchase Exposition, 1904.
 Silver Medal, Alaska-Yukon Pacific Exposition, Seattle, Washington, 1909.

References

Bibliography

External links 

 
 Granville Redmond at AskART
 Granville Redmond at Artcyclopedia
 The Silence and Solitude of Granville Redmond at California Plein Air Paintings
 Overlooked No More: Granville Redmond, Painter, Actor, Friend at The New York Times

1871 births
1935 deaths
19th-century American painters
American male painters
20th-century American painters
Tonalism
American Impressionist painters
American landscape painters
Deaf artists
Painters from California
Académie Julian alumni
San Francisco Art Institute alumni
American deaf people
19th-century American male artists
20th-century American male artists